Josiah Daniel Deguara (born February 14, 1997) is an American football tight end for the Green Bay Packers of the National Football League (NFL). He played college football at Cincinnati and was drafted by the Packers in the third round of the 2020 NFL Draft.

Early life and high school career
Deguara attended Folsom High School in Folsom, California. Listed as a three-star recruit by 247 Sports and a two-star recruit by 247sports Composite, Deguara picked Cincinnati over an offer from Air Force.

College career
Deguara gained 1,117 yards on 92 receptions during his collegiate career at the University of Cincinnati. He had 13 touchdowns combined in his junior and senior seasons. Deguara was a First-team All-American Athletic Conference selection.

Professional career

The Green Bay Packers selected Deguara in the third round with the 94th overall pick in the 2020 NFL Draft. He signed his rookie contract on July 24, 2020. He saw his first professional action on September 13, 2020, during a Week 1 victory over the Minnesota Vikings, recording one catch for 12 yards. He suffered a torn ACL in Week 5 and was placed on injured reserve on October 13, 2020.

On November 21, 2021, Deguara scored his first NFL touchdown on a 25-yard pass from Aaron Rodgers during a 34–31 loss to the Minnesota Vikings.

NFL career statistics

Regular season

Postseason

Personal life
While at the University of Cincinnati, Deguara interned in the operations department of FC Cincinnati.

References

External links
Green Bay Packers bio
Cincinnati Bearcats bio

1997 births
Living people
Players of American football from California
Sportspeople from Sacramento County, California
Sportspeople from Santa Rosa, California
American football tight ends
Cincinnati Bearcats football players
Green Bay Packers players
People from Folsom, California